Thalgau is a market town in the district of Salzburg-Umgebung in the state of Salzburg in Austria.

Geography
It is a central spot in the eastern Flachgau.

References

External links

Cities and towns in Salzburg-Umgebung District